Dolichoderus feae is a species of ant in the genus Dolichoderus. Described by Emery in 1889, it is endemic to multiple countries, notably China, India, Myanmar (Burma) and Thailand.

References

Dolichoderus
Hymenoptera of Asia
Insects of China
Insects of India
Insects of Myanmar
Insects of Thailand
Insects described in 1889